Idol Minds, LLC (doing business as Deck Nine or Deck Nine Games since 2017) is an American video game developer based in Westminster, Colorado. The studio was founded in April 1997 by Mark Lyons and Scott Atkins and developed games exclusively for PlayStation consoles until 2013. Subsequently, it shifted to mobile games among others before rebranding as "Deck Nine" in May 2017 to develop narrative-driven games. Lyons serves as president and chief technology officer of the company.

History 
Idol Minds was founded by programmer Mark Lyons and artist Scott Atkins. They had previously worked for Sony Interactive Studios America in San Diego and, after Lyons moved to Colorado with his family, established Idol Minds on April 1, 1997, in Boulder, Colorado. In November 2007, the studio released ragdoll physics-based game Pain, which was among the most-downloaded games on PlayStation Network of 2008. In October 2009, Idol Minds reportedly made 26 of its 46 employees redundant. One source attributed the layoffs to budget cuts by Pain publisher Sony Computer Entertainment (SCE), which was Idol Minds' only source of funding. At E3 2011, SCE announced Ruin, a "Diablo-style action role-playing game" developed by Idol Minds and SCE's San Diego Studio. After the game was renamed Warrior's Lair, Idol Minds was taken off the project in April 2012 (Warrior's Lair was canceled by Sony in July 2013). Later in 2012, Idol Minds shifted its focus onto mobile free-to-play games. In August 2015, Idol Minds launched a crowdfunding campaign via Kickstarter for Shutterbug, seeking  in funding. The project was canceled after raising $2,973 in ten days.

On May 31, 2017, Idol Minds announced that it would focus on narrative-driven games with brand and trade name "Deck Nine", an homage to 1983 video game Planetfall. The company built the StoryForge toolset for creating these and was developing a "brand new addition to a critically acclaimed franchise". During E3 2017, publisher Square Enix announced Deck Nine was developing Life Is Strange: Before the Storm, a prequel to 2015's Life Is Strange. The game's first episode was announced for release in August 2017. In September 2018, Deck Nine announced it was working with Square Enix on a new project. In March 2021, Square Enix announced Deck Nine to Life Is Strange: True Colors and the Life Is Strange Remastered Collection (containing remasters of Before the Storm and the original Life Is Strange) for release in September 2021. The Colorado Office of Economic Development and International Trade (OEDIT) supported Deck Nine with $2.5 million job-growth incentive tax credits and via the Colorado Office of Film, Television and Media (COFTM), the production of True Colors with $150,000 phased film incentives in 2017 and 2018. In December 2021, Telltale Games announced to be co-developing The Expanse: A Telltale Series with Deck Nine during The Game Awards 2021.

Games developed

As Idol Minds

As Deck Nine

References

External links 
 

1997 establishments in Colorado
American companies established in 1997
Companies based in Jefferson County, Colorado
Software companies based in Colorado
Video game companies established in 1997
Video game companies of the United States
Video game development companies
Westminster, Colorado